The British Columbia Excalibur Party was a registered political party founded in 2013, running in the 2013 provincial election. Michael Halliday is the party leader and founder.

The symbol of the British Columbia Excalibur Party is King Arthur's sword, Excalibur, with the words Truth, Honour and Justice written beneath the length of the blade. The BC Excalibur Party, as it will be shown on the ballot, bases its party ideals on the concept that "The Land, The People And The Government Are One". Another motto that the party embraces is "Am I My Brother's Keeper?" "Yes, You Are!"

The party platform for the British Columbia Excalibur Party covered various topics including health, employment, education, environment, the homeless, housing, transit, public safety, justice, social justice, freedom of speech, economy and general issues.

The British Columbia Excalibur Party believed that they must create a society where people can count on the principles of truth, honour, integrity and justice and feel defended and protected by their leaders so that they can live in peace and prosperity.

The party ran no candidates in the 2020 British Columbia general election, and their website is dead.

References

External links
 BC Excalibur Party official website 

Excalibur Party
Excalibur Party
Political parties established in 2013